Pidbuzh is an urban-type settlement in Drohobych Raion of Lviv Oblast in Ukraine. It is located in the Carpathian Mountains, at the banks of the Bystrytsia Pysmenytska, a right tributary of the Dniester. It belongs to Skhidnytsia settlement hromada, one of the hromadas of Ukraine. Population:

Economy

Transportation
The settlement is connected by roads with Drohobych, as well as with Sambir where there is access to Highway H13 connecting Lviv with Uzhhorod.

The closest railway stations are also in Drohobych and Sambir.

References

Urban-type settlements in Drohobych Raion